Center Moriches was a station stop along the Montauk Branch of the Long Island Rail Road. It was located on Railroad Avenue and Hamilton Street in Center Moriches, New York.

History
The station was built by the Brooklyn and Montauk Railroad, around 1881 as "Moriches Station" after the original Moriches station was renamed for the geographically correct Eastport, New York. At some point the station was renamed as well for the more geographically correct Center Moriches, New York. Until 1906, it was also a terminal with a wye, a small yard, and a transfer point for one of the east end scoots. When East Moriches and Eastport stations were closed by the Long Island Rail Road on October 6, 1958, commuters who used those stations were advised to use Center Moriches station, thus transforming it into the last railroad station in the Moricheses. The station house was razed in 1964, but a new shelter was built sometime around 1985. The station closed on March 16, 1998; at the time, it only served 5 passengers per day. The arrival of the C3 bi-level coaches meant that all stations in the LIRR's diesel territory had to receive high-level platforms, and building new platforms for such a low-usage station was not cost-effective.

References

External links
Center Moriches Station (Arrt's Arrchives)
Center Moriches Station History (TrainsAreFun)

Former Long Island Rail Road stations in Suffolk County, New York
Railway stations in the United States opened in 1881
1881 establishments in New York (state)
Railway stations closed in 1998
1998 disestablishments in New York (state)